Six referendums were held in Switzerland during 2006. The first was held on 21 May on revising article 48a in the Swiss Federal Constitution on education, and was approved by 86% of voters. The second set of three referendums was held on 24 September on proposed amendments to the laws on asylum and foreigners, as well as a popular initiative on diverting profits from the Swiss National Bank into the national pension fund. The two laws were approved, whilst the initiative was rejected.

The final two referendums were held on 26 November on laws on assistance to Poland and other poorer EU countries, and family allowances. Both were approved.

Results

References

2006 elections in Switzerland
2006 referendums
2006
Pension referendums